The Bishop of Monmouth is the diocesan bishop of the Church in Wales Diocese of Monmouth.

The episcopal see covers the historic county of Monmouthshire with the bishop's seat located at the Cathedral Church of Saint Woolos in Newport, which had been elevated to that status in 1921.

The bishop's residence is Bishopstow, which is in central Newport.

The diocese is one of two new ones founded in 1921 when the Church in Wales became independent of the established Church of England. The most recent bishop was Richard Pain, who had previously been the Archdeacon of Monmouth before being elected Bishop of Monmouth. The previous bishop was Dominic Walker OGS, previously area Bishop of Reading in the Church of England and who retired on 30 June 2013. The Diocese of Monmouth has also produced a number of Archbishops of Wales, most notably Rowan Williams, who was subsequently appointed Archbishop of Canterbury in 2002 - the first Welsh bishop to hold that post since the English Reformation in the 16th century. He was also the Archbishop of Wales at the time of his appointment to Canterbury and was styled as "Rowan Williams, Archbishop of Wales and Bishop of Monmouth".

List of bishops

Sources

External links 

Monmouth
 
Newport, Wales
Lists of Welsh people
Monmouth